is a Japanese politician and current member of the House of Representatives for the Saga Proportional District. He was previously the governor of Saga Prefecture from 2003 to 2014. A native of Karatsu, Saga, he graduated from the University of Tokyo in 1982 and entered the Ministry of Home Affairs upon graduation.

References

External links 
 Official website 

University of Tokyo alumni
People from Saga Prefecture
1958 births
Living people
Governors of Saga Prefecture